Meenambakkam is a southern neighbourhood of Chennai in the Indian state of Tamil Nadu. It is home to Chennai International Airport, the Airports Authority of India regional office, and the DGQA Complex. It was under the reign of the Pallava kingdom. The name Meenambakkam signifies that it is a settlement near the coast. Pakkam means a settlement near to the coast. Meenambakkam was cherished with lakes, ponds and borderlines the Adyar river. This makes it a rich source of fishes. Hence the name Meenambakkam was coined.

Temples

Sridevi Sakthi Santhiamman Temple
Sridevi Sakthi Santhiamman Temple is one of the oldest temples in the city situated amidst the airport. The deity is called Santhiamman as she is believed to safeguard the village sitting at the santhi, which means junction in Tamil. Santhiamman is worshiped by the local people.

Sridevi Periyapalayathamman Temple
Sridevi Periyapalayathamman Temple is one of the major temples situated in the locality. The goddesses is worshiped by the local villagers and the annual festival of this temple is the major celebration of the village.

Education
 Government Adi Dravida Welfare Higher Secondary School
 Kendriya Vidyalaya Meenambakkam
 Kendriya Vidyalaya DGQA
 Civil Aviation School
 Little Flower School (till UKG or Sr KG)
 Kalyanamayee Primary and Nursery School (until fifth)
 Jain School (CBSE Board)
 Prince Matriculation school and A. M. Jain College

Politics
Meenambakkam comes under Greater Chennai Corporation Zone 12. It comes under Pallavaram  assembly constituency in Tamil Nadu, India, that was formed after constituency delimitation in 2007 and Alandur Constituency. Located in newly formed Chennai district, it is included in the Sriperumbudur parliamentary constituency for Lok Sabha elections.

Demographics

 Indian census, Meenambakkam had a population of more than 6,241. The voting population numbered 3,620, with 1,790 male and 1,830 female voters.

Transportation
Chennai Suburban Railway Network

Meenambakkam Railway Station is one of the railway stations of the Chennai Beach–Chengalpet section of the Chennai Suburban Railway Network. It serves the neighbourhood of Meenambakkam, a suburb of Chennai. It is an upcoming busiest Suburban Railway station, which is also accessed by neighbourhood of Nanganallur, Moovarasampettai.

Metro

The Meenambakkam Metro station, comes under the Blue Line, which is a part of the Chennai Metro, was introduced in 2016. Initially it ran between Chennai International Airport and Koyambedu, later the line is extended to Washermanpet, as a part of Blue Line.

Theatres
Meenambakkam has several theatres: Velan and Vetrivel (also known as Ranga theatre), Janatha Theatre Pallavaram, Vetri, and Rakesh in Chrompet and recently PVR had launched its new Multiplex theatre at Thirusoolam Named PVR Grand Galada.

See also
 Meenambakkam bomb blast

References

Cities and towns in Chennai district